The BMW M70 is a naturally-aspirated, SOHC, V12 petrol engine, which was BMW's first production V12 and was produced from 1987 to 1996.

The BMW S70/2 engine, largely unrelated to the M70 and S70B56 engines, is a naturally-aspirated, DOHC, V12 petrol engine, which powered the 1993 to 1998 McLaren F1.

Design

The M70 has the following differences with the M20 engine:
 Aluminium alloy engine block (AluSil) instead of cast-iron (both engines have an aluminium cylinder head), to reduce weight.
 Airflow measurement using Mass air flow sensors (MAFs) instead of Air flow meters (AFMs) to improve fuel economy.
 Electronic Throttle Control instead of a mechanical throttle cable.
 A timing chain was used instead of a timing belt, to reduce servicing requirements.
 Hydraulic valve lifters instead of mechanically adjusted tappets, to reduce servicing requirements.

The M70 has two Motronic 1.7 ECUs (one for each cylinder bank). To provide redundancy, the M70 also has two fuel pumps, fuel rails, distributors, mass air flow sensors, crankshaft position sensors, coolant temperature sensors and throttle bodies.

Some M70 engines (such as fitted to the E32 750iL Highline) are fitted with two alternators. The second alternator is smaller and is used to charge an auxiliary battery and power equipment in the rear passenger compartment, such as a telephone, fax machine, wine cooler, independent climate control and power sun shields.

Versions

M70B50
Applications:
1987–1994 E32 750i/750iL – this was mated primarily to an automatic ZF 4HP24 transmission
1989–1994 E31 850i/850Ci – this was mated to either the automatic ZF 4HP24 transmission or the optional Getrag 560G

S70 engine

S70B56
The first engine to use the S70 name is a  variant of the M70 engine fitted only to the E31 850CSi. With 1,510 units produced, this is the lowest production BMW engine to date.

Three prototype dual overhead camshaft S70 engines were constructed, prior to the decision to not produce an E31 M8 model.

Applications:
 1992–1996 E31 850CSi
 2011 Simbol Design Lavazza GTX-R (twin-turbo version)

S70/2
The S70/2, while sharing the same 12 cylinder layout, bore spacing and design principle as the S70B56, is essentially a new design with the heads based on the European market S50B32, and thus featuring 4 valves per cylinder and variable valve timing (called VANOS by BMW) and individual throttle bodies. A dry sump oiling system is used.

Applications:
 1993–1998 McLaren F1

S70/3
The S70/3 is a racing engine based on the S70/2.

Applications
 1998–1999 BMW V12 LM racing car
 1999–2000 BMW V12 LMR racing car
 2000 BMW X5 LM racing car

References

M70
V12 engines
Gasoline engines by model